Wān Kawngi is a town in Shan State, Myanmar. It is part of Lawksawk Township of Taunggyi District.

History
This town was visited by Sir George Scott in the 19th century.

References

Populated places in Shan State